The GP CTT Correios de Portugal is a road bicycle racing stage race held annually in Portugal. Since 2005, it has been organised as a 2.1 event on the UCI Europe Tour.

Winners

Cycle races in Portugal
UCI Europe Tour races
Recurring sporting events established in 2000
2000 establishments in Portugal
Defunct cycling races in Portugal